Keith Jeffrey Brown (born May 6, 1960) is a Canadian former professional ice hockey defenceman who played sixteen seasons in the National Hockey League from 1979 until 1995. His first fourteen seasons were played with the Chicago Black Hawks. He helped the Blackhawks reach the 1992 Stanley Cup Finals, but missed the final round with an injury.

Playing career
Brown was drafted seventh overall by the Blackhawks in the 1979 NHL Entry Draft. Boston Bruins' general manager Harry Sinden was eager to select Brown with Boston's eighth overall pick, but had to change his plans when Brown was selected by Chicago. Sinden's "Plan B" ended up being future Hall Of Fame defenceman Raymond Bourque, who was selected by Boston immediately after Brown.

Known for his competitiveness, Brown helped Chicago reach the Stanley Cup finals in 1992. Late in his career, Brown was dealt to the expansion Florida Panthers in exchange for Darin Kimble. He played 876 career NHL games, scoring 68 goals and 274 assists for 342 points.

Personal life
According to a 2006 issue of The Hockey News, Brown currently lives in Georgia, working as a network analyst. He has been married to wife Debbie for 27 years, and has four children: Cody, Katie, Christy, and Casey. His charities include Hockey Ministries International and Christian Missions.

Career statistics

Regular season and playoffs

International

Awards
 WCHL Second All-Star Team – 1978
 WHL First All-Star Team – 1979

References

External links

1960 births
Living people
Canadian ice hockey defencemen
Chicago Blackhawks draft picks
Chicago Blackhawks players
Florida Panthers players
Fort Saskatchewan Traders players
Ice hockey people from Newfoundland and Labrador
National Hockey League first-round draft picks
People from Corner Brook
Portland Winterhawks players